Didier Santini (born 7 September 1968) is a French football manager and former player who manages Rodez of the French second division. 

He spent the majority of his playing career in the top two divisions of French football with Marseille, Bastia, Toulouse and Lille. In the 2001–02 season, he had a spell with Scottish Premier League side Livingston.

Coaching career
After retiring, Santini began his coaching career as a youth coach for SC Bastia. Santini was then appointed manager of CFA2 club Calvi in 2009. Two years later, he led the team to promotion to the CFA.

In the summer 2018, Santini was appointed assistant manager for China national under-19 football team under manager Patrick Gonfalone, who he met in 2017 during his process to gain a coaching license. On 9 November 2019, he became the manager of AS Béziers. He left by mutual consent in April 2021.

Santini was appointed head coach of Stade Briochin in 2021, but was dismissed from his duties in September 2022.

In November 2022, Santini took charge of Rodez AF, at the time in the relegation zone of Ligue 2. Santini replaced long-time manager Laurent Peyrelade.

References

External links
 

1968 births
Living people
Association football defenders
French footballers
Ligue 1 players
Scottish Premier League players
Olympique de Marseille players
Ligue 2 players
SC Bastia players
Toulouse FC players
Lille OSC players
Livingston F.C. players
Borgo FC players
French expatriate footballers
Expatriate footballers in Scotland
French football managers
AS Béziers (2007) managers
USL Dunkerque managers